José Luis Cerrillo Garnica (born 9 December 1952) is a Mexican politician from the Institutional Revolutionary Party. From 2007 to 2009 he served as Deputy of the LX Legislature of the Mexican Congress representing Michoacán.

References

1952 births
Living people
Politicians from Michoacán
Institutional Revolutionary Party politicians
21st-century Mexican politicians
Deputies of the LX Legislature of Mexico
Members of the Chamber of Deputies (Mexico) for Michoacán